Yampupata is a small town in the department of La Paz  in Bolivia, located in the Cantón Zampaya in the municipality of Copacabana in the province of Manco Kapac.

Population

The town's population increased by almost a third in the decade between the 2001 and 2012 censuses :

Due to the historical population development, the region has a high proportion of Aymara population, in the Municipio Copacabana 94.3% of the population speak the Aymara language.

References

Populated places in La Paz Department (Bolivia)